The 2022 Liga 1 Putri season will be the fourth season of Liga 1 Putri, the top-flight Indonesian league for women's association football. The season was planned to start in October 2022 and end in December 2022, but some sources revealed the season will start in January 2023.

Persib Putri were the defending champions after winning 2019 Liga 1 Putri, as the 2020 and 2021 edition was cancelled due to the COVID-19 pandemic in Indonesia.

References

Indonesia
2022
2022 in Indonesian football leagues